Bradley Bowden (born May 26, 1983) is a Canadian ice sledge hockey and wheelchair basketball player.

Life 
Born in Missisauga, Ontario, Bowden lives with sacral agenesis. He began playing ice sledge hockey in 1997, aged 13, for the Kitchener Sidewinders. At the age of 15, he was selected for Canada's national team. In 2003, he was named to the men's national wheelchair basketball team which eventually won gold in the 2004 summer Paralympic games in Athens, Greece. He is one of the few Paralympic athletes to win both a Paralympic gold medal in both summer and winter games.

Honours
Canadian Disability Hall of Fame induction in 2019
2014 Winter Paralympics
Bronze in ice sledge hockey
2012 IPC Ice Sledge Hockey World Championships
Bronze
2010 Winter Paralympics
4th place in ice sledge hockey
Named Tournament MVP
2009 IPC Ice Sledge Hockey World Championships
Bronze
2008 IPC Ice Sledge Hockey World Championships
Gold
Named Best Forward
2006 Winter Paralympics
Gold in ice sledge hockey
Scored Game Winning Goal
2004 Summer Paralympics
Gold in wheelchair basketball
2004 IPC Ice Sledge Hockey World Championships
4th place
2002 Winter Paralympics
4th place
2000 IPC Ice Sledge Hockey World Championships
Gold (2-1 against Norway)

References

External links
 
 
 
 
 

1983 births
Living people
Sportspeople from Mississauga
Canadian sledge hockey players
Canadian men's wheelchair basketball players
Paralympic sledge hockey players of Canada
Paralympic wheelchair basketball players of Canada
Paralympic gold medalists for Canada
Paralympic bronze medalists for Canada
Ice sledge hockey players at the 2010 Winter Paralympics
Ice sledge hockey players at the 2014 Winter Paralympics
Wheelchair basketball players at the 2004 Summer Paralympics
Medalists at the 2006 Winter Paralympics
Medalists at the 2014 Winter Paralympics
Canadian Disability Hall of Fame
Medalists at the 2004 Summer Paralympics
Medalists at the 2018 Winter Paralympics
Paralympic medalists in sledge hockey
Paralympic medalists in wheelchair basketball